The Citizens' Forum on Canada's Future was a commission established in November 1990 by Prime Minister Brian Mulroney. It was more commonly known as the Spicer Commission, after its chairman, Keith Spicer.

Background 

In the wake of the failure of the Meech Lake Accord, the federal government attempted to reach out to citizens by means of a public commission of inquiry. In response to a perception that the country's unity was being threatened by linguistic and regional divisions, the purpose of the Citizens' Forum on Canada's Future was to engage Canadians in a discussion about the political and social future of Canada.  The Spicer Commission held town hall meetings across the country and solicited input from Canadians on the future of the country.

Report 

The commission's report was released in June 1991. The Commission noted that many Canadians were willing to recognize Quebec's cultural and linguistic differences but not to grant the province special powers that might weaken the central government; most respondents saw official bilingualism as divisive and costly; the education system and media had not done enough to promote national unity; Canadians regarded cutbacks to federal institutions as insensitive to national symbols; and many Canadians had a lack of faith in government leaders and the political process. Also notable was Spicer's comment that there was "a fury in the land" against Mulroney.

Some of the report's contents were subsequently used in the development of the Charlottetown Accord.

Members
Richard Cashin

Carole Corcoran

Fil Fraser

Thomas Kierans

Jim Matkin

Robert Normand

Raymond Sirois

Keith Spicer, Chairman

Roger Tassé

Susan Van De Velde

Elsie Wayne

Helena Zukowski

References 

Colombo, John Robert. Canadian Global Almanac. Toronto: Global Press, 1992.
D. Leyton-Brown, ed., Canadian Annual Review of Politics and Public Affairs 1991. Toronto: University of Toronto Press, 1992.

Constitution of Canada
Canadian commissions and inquiries
History of Canada (1982–1992)
Constitutional commissions
1990 establishments in Canada
1991 documents